National Eligibility cum Entrance Test may refer to:

 National Eligibility cum Entrance Test (Undergraduate), an entrance examination in India for students who wish to study undergraduate medical and dental courses
 National Eligibility cum Entrance Test (Postgraduate), an entrance examination in India for students who wish to study postgraduate medical courses